Sarah Buxton is the debut album by American country singer-songwriter Sarah Buxton. It was released on February 23, 2010 via Lyric Street Records. The album's only single, "Outside My Window," was released in June 2009 and was a Top 25 hit on the U.S. Billboard Hot Country Songs chart, reaching a peak of number 23 in March 2010. The album also includes Buxton's previous three singles that were released on her extended-play, Almost My Record. As of April 2010, the album has sold nearly 30,000 copies.

History
Prior to its release, Buxton issued a six-song extended play entitled Almost My Record. This EP produced the singles "Innocence," "That Kind of Day" and "Space," all of which charted in the country music Top 40. Those three singles and two other tracks from the EP are included on this album, as is her fourth single, "Outside My Window." Buxton co-wrote ten of the eleven songs, including "Stupid Boy," which was previously released by Keith Urban as a single from his 2006 album Love, Pain & the Whole Crazy Thing.

Critical reception
Jessica Phillips of Country Weekly magazine described Buxton's vocal range as "transform[ing] from sunny to sweet[…]to scratchy and soulful" and referred to the songs' topics as "being a typical 20-something-year-old girl in America." Phillips gave the album three-and-a-half stars out of five. Bobby Peacock of Roughstock also described Buxton's voice favorably and called the lyrics "optimistic," but thought that some tracks were overproduced. Stephen Thomas Erlewine considered the album "carefully constructed, with each element designed to reach the broadest possible audience" but said that it also showed that Buxton is "a solid writer and performer,"ultimately giving it three stars out of five.

Track listing

Personnel

Musicians

 Tim Akers – accordion, keyboards
 Steve Bryant – bass guitar
 Tom Bukovac – acoustic guitar, bass guitar, electric guitar
 Sarah Buxton – harmonica, lead vocals, background vocals
 Matt Chamberlain – drums
 Perry Coleman – background vocals
 J.T. Corenflos – electric guitar
 Blair Daly – background vocals
 Eric Darken – percussion
 Dan Dugmore – acoustic guitar, steel guitar, lap steel guitar
 Mike Durham – electric guitar
 Caitlin Evanson – background vocals
 Shawn Fichter – drums
 Tony Harrell – keyboards
 Dann Huff – banjo, 12-string acoustic guitar, acoustic guitar, electric guitar
 Jedd Hughes – acoustic guitar, electric guitar, soloist, duet vocals (3,5,11)
 Joanna Janét – background vocals
 Charlie Judge – Hammond B-3 organ, synthesizer
 Troy Lancaster – electric guitar
 Chris McHugh – drums 
 Chip Matthews – strings, background vocals
 Greg Morrow – drums
 Russ Pahl – steel guitar
 Alison Prestwood – bass guitar
 Brian Pruitt – drums, percussion
 Curt Ryle – acoustic guitar
 Gordie Sampson – accordion, mandolin, background vocals
 Jimmie Lee Sloas – bass guitar
 Gary Smith – Hammond B-3 organ
 Wanda Vick – bouzouki
 Glenn Worf – bass guitar
 Jonathan Yudkin – fiddle, mandolin, strings

Production
tracks 1, 8-10 – Dann Huff, Craig Wiseman
tracks 2, 7 – Sarah Buxton
tracks 3, 5, 11 – Dann Huff
track 4 – Sarah Buxton, Bob DiPiero
track 6 – Sarah Buxton, Blair Daly

Chart performance
The album debuted at number 12 on U.S. Billboard Top Country Albums and number 68 on the U.S. Billboard 200, selling over 8,000 copies in its first week.

Album

References

2010 debut albums
Sarah Buxton albums
Lyric Street Records albums